Shor Gol (also Romanized as Shor Göl, Shor Gol, and Shūr Gol) is a village in Kenarporuzh Rural District, in the Central District of Salmas County, West Azerbaijan Province, Iran. At the 2006 census, its population was 430, in 119 families.

References 

Populated places in Salmas County